Jerry Montgomery (born September 19, 1979) is an American football coach and former player who is the defensive line coach and running game coordinator for the Green Bay Packers of the National Football League (NFL).

Playing career
Montgomery played his high school football at Virgin Valley High School in Mesquite, Nevada, where he was a Street & Smith All-American and the Nevada State Player of the Year in 1997.  Montgomery was also a member of the state basketball championship team as a junior.

Montgomery was a four-year starter for the Iowa Hawkeyes football team from 1998-2002 under head coaches Hayden Fry and Kirk Ferentz.  He concluded his college career in the Hula Bowl All-Star Game at the completion of his senior season.  Montgomery graduated from Iowa with a bachelor's degree in African American Studies in 2002.

Following his college playing career, he went to training camp with the New Orleans Saints in 2002, but was released before the season. Montgomery later played in the Arena Football League with the Chicago Rush, Colorado Crush, and Las Vegas Gladiators from 2003-2005.

Coaching career
Montgomery began a career in coaching while he was playing in the Arena League, working as an assistant at Iowa City West High School and North Iowa Area Community College.  He later served as a graduate assistant at Northern Iowa in 2006, before being promoted to full-time defensive line coach for the 2007 and 2008 seasons.

In 2009, Montgomery moved west to serve as defensive line coach at Wyoming on the first staff of Dave Christensen, staying through the 2010 season.

In January 2011, Montgomery briefly served as defensive tackles coach at Indiana under head coach Kevin Wilson. However, he was soon hired away by Michigan and new head coach Brady Hoke in February 2011.  Montgomery served as defensive line coach for the Wolverines for the 2011 and 2012 seasons.  With the Wolverines, Montgomery served as the chief recruiter for 5-star commitments Derrick Green and Ondre Pipkins

From 2013-2014, Montgomery served as the defensive line coach at Oklahoma under head coach Bob Stoops, earning a salary of $325,000 in 2013 and $380,000 in 2014.  He was promoted after two seasons with Oklahoma to co-defensive coordinator on January 6, 2015, where he was expected to lead the defense alongside Mike Stoops.

His tenure as co-defensive coordinator with the Sooners was brief.  On February 12, 2015, the Green Bay Packers of the NFL confirmed that they hired Montgomery, giving him the title of "defensive front assistant".  Montgomery stated that the Packers "offered an unbelievable opportunity" to pursue his dream of coaching in the National Football League.

In January 2018, Montgomery was hired as the assistant head coach and defensive line coach on Jimbo Fisher's staff at Texas A&M.  Later in January 2018, Montgomery instead opted to remain with the Packers as the defensive line coach on the reorganized staff of head coach Mike McCarthy.  Montgomery had spent 2 weeks recruiting on behalf of Texas A&M
On March 17, 2022, Montgomery was promoted to defensive line/running game coordinator.

References

External links
 Green Bay Packers bio

1979 births
Living people
American football defensive tackles
Green Bay Packers coaches
Indiana Hoosiers football coaches
Iowa Hawkeyes football coaches
Iowa Hawkeyes football players
Michigan Wolverines football coaches
New Orleans Saints players
Northern Iowa Panthers football coaches
Oklahoma Sooners football coaches
People from Mesquite, Nevada
Players of American football from Los Angeles
Coaches of American football from California
Wyoming Cowboys football coaches
Sports coaches from Los Angeles